Acerum is the name used to describe maple eau de vie (brandy) made in Quebec, Canada, following the specifications of Canada's the Union of Maple Spirits Distillers (UDSÉ). Acerum comes from the Latin words “acer” meaning maple and the English word “rum”. It refers to fermentation and distillation similar to rum, but where maple syrup replaces the cane sugar found in rum.

History
In the 1970s, distillers began to produce alcohol from maple syrup. Although some distilled alcohol tests were then carried out in university laboratories, it was not until the 1990s that certain maple syrup producers began to produce a wine based on this sweet resource, which was initially called Acer.

During the same period, some distilleries began to market maple eau-de-vie, but it was not until December 2017 that the name Acerum appeared for the first time for a maple eau-de-vie.

Area of production
As defined by the specifications of the UDSÉ, Acerum must be entirely manufactured in the province of Quebec, in Canada, with maple syrup, maple concentrate, or maple sap from Quebec maples.

References

Further reading

Nimbus Publishing Ltd, Canadian Spirits - The essential cross-country guide to Distilleries, their Spirits, and where to imbibe them, Pages 62 & 84, Stephen Beaumont & Christine Sismondo, 2020, 
Penguin Random House Canada, The Definitive Guide to Canadian Distilleries - The Portable Expert to Over 200 Distilleries and the Spirits they Make, Pages 243 et 297, Davin de Kergommeaux & Blair Phillips, 2020, 

Brandies